Ihor Viktorovych Lutsenko (born 10 November 1978) is a Ukrainian journalist and politician. 

Lutsenko took part in the Euromaidan protests in Kyiv. In January 2014, he was abducted and beaten along with Yuriy Verbytsky who died.

In 2014, he was elected to the Verkhovna Rada on the party list of Batkivshchyna. But in the 2019 Ukrainian parliamentary election he lost reelection for this party in constituency 154 (Rivne Oblast). In October 2019 Lutsenko became an adviser of the Mayor of Kyiv Vitali Klitschko.

Awards 
 On 3 May 2022 President Zelensky awarded Ihor Lutsenko with Order for Courage for his participation starting from Spring 2014 in the Russo-Ukrainian war mostly for his impact as operator of drones in deterring Russian aggressors first of all during the Battle of Kyiv.

References

1978 births
Living people
Politicians from Kyiv
Journalists from Kyiv
Eighth convocation members of the Verkhovna Rada
People of the Euromaidan
All-Ukrainian Union "Fatherland" politicians